Chūō-ku (中央区 Chūō-ku) is a common ward name in many large Japanese cities, as "chūō" means "center", or "central", in Japanese.

This is a list of Chūō-ku in cities in Japan.

 Chūō-ku, Sapporo
 Chūō-ku, Saitama
 Chūō-ku, Chiba
 Chūō, Tokyo
 Chūō-ku, Sagamihara
 Chūō-ku, Niigata
 Chūō-ku, Osaka
 Chūō-ku, Kobe
 Chūō-ku, Fukuoka
 Chūō-ku, Kumamoto

See also
Naka-ku (disambiguation)